Sea change or sea-change is an English idiomatic expression which denotes a substantial change in perspective, especially one which affects a group or society at large, on a particular issue.  It is similar in usage and meaning to a paradigm shift, and may be viewed as a change to a society or community's zeitgeist, with regard to a specific issue. The phrase evolved from an older and more literal usage when the term referred to an actual "change wrought by the sea", a definition that remains in limited usage.

History
The term appears in William Shakespeare's The Tempest in the song Full fathom five sung by a supernatural spirit, Ariel, to Ferdinand, a prince of Naples, after Ferdinand's father's apparent death by drowning. The term sea change is used to mean a metamorphosis or alteration.

Usage
A literary character may transform over time into a better person after undergoing various trials or tragedies (e.g. "There is a sea change in Scrooge's personality towards the end of Charles Dickens' A Christmas Carol.") As with the term Potemkin village, sea change has also been used in business culture. In the United States, it is often used as a corporate or institutional buzzword.  In this context, it need not refer to a substantial or significant transformation.

References

Further reading

 
 Rich and Strange: Gender, History, Modernism. pp. 3- (preview page 4 not shown in preview)
 The Absent Shakespeare. pp. 131–132.
 Data Protection: Governance, Risk Management, and Compliance. p. xx.
 Complexity, Management and the Dynamics of Change: Challenges for Practice. p. 78.
The Shakespeare Wars: Clashing Scholars, Public Fiascoes, Palace Coups. p. 509.
Shakespeare Survey, Volume 24. p. 106.

English-language idioms
The Tempest